{{DISPLAYTITLE:C13H9N}}
The molecular formula C13H9N (molar mass: 179.22 g/mol, exact mass: 179.0735 u) may refer to:

 Acridine
 Phenanthridine

Molecular formulas